Tibava is a village and municipality in the Sobrance District in the Košice Region of eastern Slovakia.

History
In historical records the village was first mentioned in 1282.

Geography
The village lies at an altitude of 129 metres and covers an area of 10.657 km². It has a population of 530.

Facilities
The village has a public library, a gymnasium and a soccer pitch.

References

External links
 
http://www.statistics.sk/mosmis/eng/run.html
http://en.e-obce.sk/obec/tibava/tibava.html
https://web.archive.org/web/20130410080105/http://www.tibava.ocu.sk/

Villages and municipalities in Sobrance District